Abdullah Mazari (born 7 March 1987), commonly referred to as Abdullah, is an Afghan cricket player. A left-handed batsman and left-arm orthodox spin bowler, he has played for the Afghanistan national cricket team since 2001 and has also played for Peshawar, Peshawar Panthers and Afghan Cheetahs.

In August 2021, he accompanied Taliban fighters who visited the headquarters of the Afghanistan Cricket Board.

Biography

Born in Mazar-i-Sharif in 1987 Abdullah first played for Afghanistan in October 2001 in a Grade II Quaid-e-Azam Trophy match against Nowshera. He played three times for them two years later, but it would be a number of years before he returned to the national side, though he did play for Nowshera in the lower tiers of Pakistani domestic cricket a number of times, including one match against Afghanistan in 2007.

He made his first-class debut for Peshawar against Sialkot in the Quaid-e-Azam Trophy in February 2009, also playing against Faisalabad the following week. He returned to play for Afghanistan the following year, playing in an Intercontinental Cup match against Scotland in Ayr. He made his ODI debut in October 2010, playing twice against Kenya. He then played in the final of the 2009–10 Intercontinental Cup in Dubai against Scotland which Afghanistan won by 7 wickets.

In 2011, he played four List A matches for Peshawar Panthers and a Twenty20 match for the Afghan Cheetahs.

In July 2018, he was the leading wicket-taker for Kabul Region in the 2018 Ghazi Amanullah Khan Regional One Day Tournament, with seven dismissals in four matches.

References

Living people
1987 births
Sportspeople from Mazar-i-Sharif
Afghan cricketers
Peshawar cricketers
Afghanistan One Day International cricketers
Afghan Cheetahs cricketers
Asian Games medalists in cricket
Cricketers at the 2014 Asian Games
Asian Games silver medalists for Afghanistan
Medalists at the 2014 Asian Games
Kabul Eagles cricketers